The 1929 Idaho Vandals football team represented the University of Idaho in the 1929 college football season. The Vandals were led by first-year head coach Leo Calland and were in their eighth season in the Pacific Coast Conference.  Home games were played on campus in Moscow at MacLean Field. Idaho compiled a 4–5 overall record and went  in conference games.

Calland was previously a USC assistant coach and a former player for the Trojans, a guard and captain as a senior on the 1922 team that won the Rose Bowl. Raised in Seattle, he was also the head coach of the USC basketball team for two seasons.

In the Battle of the Palouse with neighbor Washington State, the Cougars won for the second straight year, their first at home in Pullman in eight years.

The Vandals finished the season with a two-game road trip to Los Angeles and Pocatello in southeastern Idaho. Calland's return to USC was harsh, with a 72-point shutout by the Trojans to extend the season's losing streak to five games. The final game on Thanksgiving was a 41–7 win over the Tigers of the university's Southern Branch, today's Idaho State University, but then a two-year school.

Schedule

 The Little Brown Stein trophy for the Montana game debuted nine years later in 1938
 One game was played on Thursday (Southern Branch at Pocatello on Thanksgiving)

All-conference
No Vandals were named to the All-Coast team. on the All-Northwest team, tackle Gordon Diehl and center Lester Kirkpatrick were first team selections.

References

External links
Gem of the Mountains: 1930 University of Idaho yearbook – 1929 football season 
 Go Mighty Vandals – 1929 football season
 Scout.com: Idaho – The 1920s Series (Part IV) 
Official game program: Idaho at Washington State –  November 9, 1929
Idaho Argonaut – student newspaper – 1929 editions

Idaho
Idaho Vandals football seasons
Idaho Vandals football